The men's tournament in volleyball at the 1984 Summer Olympics was the 6th edition of the event at the Summer Olympics, organized by the world's governing body, the FIVB in conjunction with the IOC. It was held in Long Beach, California, United States from 29 July to 11 August 1984.

Qualification

* Soviet Union, Cuba, Poland and Bulgaria withdrew because of the Soviet-led boycott and were replaced by China, Tunisia, Italy and South Korea respectively.

Pools composition

Rosters

Venue

Preliminary round

Pool A

|}

|}

Pool B

|}

|}

Final round

9th–10th places

9th place match

|}

5th–8th places

5th–8th semifinals

|}

7th place match

|}

5th place match

|}

Final four

Semifinals

|}

Bronze medal match

|}

Gold medal match

|}

Final standing

Medalists

Awards

Most Valuable Player
 Steve Timmons
Best Scorer
 Kang Man-soo
Best Spiker
 José Montanaro

Best Blocker
 Hugo Conte
Best Server
 José Montanaro
Best Receiver
 Aldis Berzins

References

External links
Final Standing (1964–2000)
Results at Todor66.com
Results at Sports123.com

O
1984
Men's events at the 1984 Summer Olympics